Gavin Keith Johnson (born 17 October 1966) is a former South African rugby union player who played for South Africa between 1993 and 1995. He played as a wing or a fullback and was a member of the squad that won the 1995 Rugby World Cup.

Career

Provincial
Johnson played 69 games for the Transvaal and scored 821 points, which at the time was the second most by a Transvaal player, after that of Gerald Bosch.

International
He played his first test match for the Springboks on 13 November 1993 against Argentina in Buenos Aires. In all, he played in seven Test matches for the Springboks, 3 of whom were at the 1995 World Cup. He also played in 5 tour matches in which he scored 87 points.

Test history 

Legend: pen = penalty (3 pts.); conv = conversion (2 pts.), drop = drop kick (3 pts.).

See also

List of South Africa national rugby union players – Springbok no. 604

References

External links
Springboks 1995
scrum.com statistics

1966 births
Living people
South African people of British descent
People from Louis Trichardt
South African rugby union players
South Africa international rugby union players
Rugby union wings
Rugby union fullbacks
Golden Lions players
Rugby union players from Limpopo